Desmocladus is a genus of herbs in the family Restionaceae, all species of which are endemic to Australia, and found in Western Australia and South Australia. In this genus, the stems are the principal photosynthesizers.

Species include:
Desmocladus asper (Nees) B.G.Briggs & L.A.S.Johnson
Desmocladus austrinus B.G.Briggs & L.A.S.Johnson
Desmocladus biformis B.G.Briggs & L.A.S.Johnson
Desmocladus castaneus B.G.Briggs & L.A.S.Johnson
Desmocladus confertospicatus (Steud.) B.G.Briggs
Desmocladus diacolpicus B.G.Briggs & L.A.S.Johnson
Desmocladus elongatus B.G.Briggs & L.A.S.Johnson
Desmocladus eludens (B.G.Briggs & L.A.S.Johnson) B.G.Briggs
Desmocladus eyreanus (B.G.Briggs & L.A.S.Johnson) B.G.Briggs
Desmocladus fasciculatus (R.Br.) B.G.Briggs & L.A.S.Johnson
Desmocladus ferruginipes (Meney & Pate) B.G.Briggs
Desmocladus flexuosus (R.Br.) B.G.Briggs & L.A.S.Johnson
Desmocladus glomeratus K.W.Dixon & Meney
Desmocladus lateriflorus (W.Fitzg.) B.G.Briggs
Desmocladus lateriticus B.G.Briggs & L.A.S.Johnson
Desmocladus laxiflorus (Steud.) B.G.Briggs
Desmocladus microcarpus (Meney & Pate) B.G.Briggs
Desmocladus myriocladus (Gilg) B.G.Briggs & L.A.S.Johnson
Desmocladus nodatus (B.G.Briggs & L.A.S.Johnson) B.G.Briggs
Desmocladus parthenicusB.G.Briggs & L.A.S.Johnson
Desmocladus quiricanus B.G.Briggs & L.A.S.Johnson
Desmocladus semiplanus B.G.Briggs & L.A.S.Johnson
Desmocladus virgatus (Benth.) B.G.Briggs & L.A.S.Johnson

Gallery

References

External links
Desmocladus on Flickr

 
Poales genera
Taxa named by Christian Gottfried Daniel Nees von Esenbeck
Plants described in 1846